This is a list of American prime time animated television series which were typically broadcast during prime time.  This list does not include animated short films and videos that were shown on television variety shows, such as "The Ambiguously Gay Duo" on Saturday Night Live and "Dr. N!Godatu" on The Tracey Ullman Show. However, the fact The Simpsons originated as part of the latter show is noted.

Pre-1990

1990s

2000s

2010s

2020s

References

External links
A Look at The Simpsons' Failed Prime Time Cartoon Competitors
'The Simpsons' and the Birth of the Modern Animated TV Comedy
Animated TV in the 2000s: DVD Resurrection, Adult Swim, and the MacFarlane Empire

Animation-related lists
Lists of animated television series